Pete Thornton is a fictional character in the ABC television series MacGyver. He is played by Dana Elcar. Pete is Angus MacGyver's best friend and boss at both the Department of External Services (DXS) and the Phoenix Foundation. Along with MacGyver, Thornton is the only regular character in the series.

Little is revealed about Pete's youth and background before the show starts, but he has been married to Connie Thornton with whom he has a son, Michael Thornton. It is also clear that he has extensive background working for the U.S. government. He was a war veteran with service in Vietnam.  At an unknown time, he left the military and joined the Department of External Services (DXS), a U.S. government agency involved in intelligence and black ops work.  He met MacGyver there in 1980 while tracking the international assassin Murdoc, and was so impressed that he recruited him into the DXS.  He reaches the position of Deputy Chief of the Department in 1986 before leaving later that same year.  He then goes to work for the Phoenix Foundation as Director of Operations, and takes MacGyver with him as a troubleshooter. Pete settles down with a desk job, but still is involved in many field operations along with MacGyver.

In 1991, actor Dana Elcar began to develop glaucoma, a degenerative condition of the eyes that causes blindness. This condition was written into the show, and Elcar's character also develops the disease.

2016 Reboot
In the 2016 reboot, the character was replaced with a female character Patricia Thornton, played by Sandrine Holt.

References

MacGyver characters
Fictional secret agents and spies
Fictional vigilantes
Television characters introduced in 1986